Aleksandar Mirkov (born 8 January 1996) is a Serbian professional footballer who plays as a defensive midfielder for Bečej.

References

External links

1996 births
Sportspeople from Kikinda
Living people
Serbian footballers
Association football midfielders
FK Spartak Subotica players
FK Palić players
FK Banat Zrenjanin players
FK Senta players
FK ŽAK Kikinda players
OFK Bečej 1918 players
FK Vojvodina players
FK Smederevo players
FK Mladost Doboj Kakanj players
FK Železničar Pančevo players
Serbian First League players
Serbian SuperLiga players
Premier League of Bosnia and Herzegovina players
Serbian expatriate footballers
Expatriate footballers in Bosnia and Herzegovina
Serbian expatriate sportspeople in Bosnia and Herzegovina